Bathytoma regnans is a species of sea snail, a marine gastropod mollusk in the family Borsoniidae.

Description
The length of the shell attains 30 mm, its diameter 12 mm.

Distribution
This species occurs in the Gulf of Aden, the Bay of Bengal and off Southern Australia.

References

 J.C. Melvill (1918), ''Description of Bathytoma regnans n.sp. from the Indian Ocean;  Proceedings of the Malacological Society of London. v. 12-13 (1916-1919)
 Alexander V. Sysoev, Deep-sea conoidean gastropods collected by the John Murray Expedition, 1933-34; Bulletin of the Natural History Museum. v.62 # 1 (1996), London

regnans
Gastropods described in 1918